Sri Lanka first competed at the Asian Games in 1951. Sri Lanka has won 46 medals across it participation at the Asian Games.

Medal tables

Medals by Asian Games

Asian Games Medals by sport

List of medalists

References